Basic Law: The Knesset is the part of the Basic Laws of Israel that governs the process of elections in the Israeli parliament or the Knesset.

The law was created in 1958 and updated in 1987.

Current voting system
Members of the Knesset are elected through proportional representation based on results for the entire national electorate. This means that seats are allocated across all parties, excluding parties that fall below the 3.25% electoral threshold. Ballot papers give voters a choice of parties, rather than choosing individual candidates.

Parties have lists of candidates in order of preference. Some political parties have their own primary votes among party-members to decide candidate lists, whilst other parties choose their candidate lists differently: In some parties, candidate lists are chosen by an assembly of political activists elected by party members, other parties (notably Shas, United Torah Judaism and Yisrael Beiteinu) have a small committee that chooses the party's candidate list, and in others (like Yesh Atid) candidate lists are chosen by one person only. Many parties have changed their way of choosing candidate lists over time.

Elections are nominally held every four years, but the Knesset or prime minister can decide to call an election early (a snap election). Also under certain circumstances elections may be postponed past four years. The only example of a delay was the election for 8th Knesset which was postponed (for two months due to the Yom Kippur War) by a special majority in the Knesset. Elections are nominally scheduled on either the first or third Tuesday of the Jewish month of Cheshvan. If the previous year was a Jewish leap year elections are held the first Tuesday of Cheshvan, otherwise, third Tuesday. It is possible for the interval between elections to be longer than four years, and up to five years if the previous early election is held near the end of the Jewish month of Cheshvan. As of 2015, the nominal schedule was observed only four times: 1959, 1965, 1969, and 1988, with the longest interval between elections being 101 days over 4 years, which occurred between the 1984 elections and the 1988 elections. With the exception of the aforementioned 1973 elections, the reason that elections were not held on the nominal date was that the election date was advanced.

See also
 Israeli Central Elections Committee

References

External links
 The Basic Law: The Knesset
 Basic Laws on WikiSource
 Jewish Law in the Debates of the Knesset (HaMishpat HaIvri b'Chakikat HaKneset) edited by Prof. Nahum Rakover. 2 vols., 1310 pp. 191-194.

Legislative elections in Israel
Knesset
3rd Knesset (1955–1959)
Knesset